Trigena is a genus of moths in the family Cossidae.

Species
 Trigena breyeri Ureta, 1957
 Trigena crassa Schaus, 1911
 Trigena granulosa Ureta, 1957
 Trigena serenensis Ureta, 1957
 Trigena terranea Ureta, 1957
 Trigena parilis Schaus, 1892

References

Natural History Museum Lepidoptera generic names catalog

Cossinae